This is a list of members of the Western Australian Legislative Council from 22 May 1965 to 21 May 1968.

The term was the first to be conducted under the Constitution Acts Amendment Act (No.2) 1963 (No.72 of 1963), which abolished the 10 three-member provinces which had existed almost unaltered since 1900 and replaced them with 15 new two-member provinces, while abolishing the practice of having separate Legislative Council elections in May of every even-numbered year. Hence, members whose terms expired on 21 May 1971 were elected at the 1965 state general election.

The chamber as a result had 30 seats made up of 15 provinces each electing two members, on a system of rotation whereby one-half of the members would retire every three years.

Notes
 On 3 September 1967, West Province (formerly Midland Province) Country MLC Ray Jones died. Country Party candidate Fred White won the resulting by-election on 21 October 1967.

Sources
  (especially p. 6)
 
 

Members of Western Australian parliaments by term